Kharkara may refer to:
Kharkara, Haryana, a village in Rohtak district, Haryana, India
 Kharkara, Rajasthan, a village in Alwar district, Rajasthan, India
 Esmailabad, Avaj, a village in Iran also known as Kharkara